Emil Irgens (2 August 1883 – 13 July 1918) was a Norwegian rower. He competed in the men's eight event at the 1908 Summer Olympics. Irgens died of the Spanish flu.

References

External links
 

1883 births
1918 deaths
Norwegian male rowers
Olympic rowers of Norway
Rowers at the 1908 Summer Olympics
Rowers from Oslo
Deaths from the Spanish flu pandemic in Norway